Don McCulloch Cowie (born 15 February 1983) is a Scottish professional football coach and former player. Cowie played as a midfielder for Inverness Caledonian Thistle, Watford, Cardiff City, Wigan Athletic, Heart of Midlothian and Ross County. Cowie made ten international appearances for the Scotland national football team between 2009 and 2012.

Club career

Ross County 
Born in Inverness, Cowie attended Dingwall Academy and came up through Ross County's youth system and went on to captain the club. His father was also a footballer for Ross County during the club's long membership of the Highland Football League. He was on the Ross County side that drew 1–1 against Clyde but beat them in a penalty shoot-out in the Challenge cup final. On 30 January 2007, he signed a pre-contract agreement with Highland derby rivals Inverness and officially joined them on 1 July 2007.

Inverness Caledonian Thistle 
Cowie's first season at the club proved fruitful as he abided so quickly to the Scottish Premier League (SPL). He scored his first goal for the club in a 2–1 defeat away to St Mirren. During Caley Thistle's poor start to the season Cowie proved to be an inspirational figure in the starting eleven. One of his best moments of the season came when he scored the third, and winning goal in Caley Thistle's 3–2 win over Celtic, as well as a stunning 20-yard volley in a win over Kilmarnock. He finished the season as Inverness' top scorer with nine goals and was voted Player of the Year in Caley Thistle's match program.

Watford 
He was set to join Championship club Watford over the summer of 2009, as he signed a pre-contract agreement with the club on 29 January 2009. Despite this agreement, Inverness and Watford agreed a fee and he moved on transfer deadline day for a nominal fee on 2 February. He made his debut for on 14 February, in the FA Cup fifth-round tie against Chelsea, appearing as a 67th-minute substitute for Lee Williamson. In the following game, he made his league debut in a 2–0 home victory against Swansea City on 17 February.

He scored his first goal for Watford against Crystal Palace, in a league game on 28 February 2009. On 7 December 2009, Cowie became the man who has the distinction of assisting Lloyd Doyley's first ever goal for Watford, he then himself went on to score in the same game, ending in a 3–1 victory against Queens Park Rangers.

Cardiff City 

On 1 July 2011, Cowie signed for Cardiff City on a three-year contract, following newly appointed Cardiff manager Malky Mackay to Wales having been convinced not to sign an improved contract at Watford so Cardiff would not have to pay for the transfer. He made his debut for the club away at West Ham United in a shock 1–0 win on the opening day of the Championship season. Cowie scored his first and second goals for the Bluebirds in a 5–3 win over Huddersfield Town in the League Cup. He scored his first league goal of the season in a 1–1 draw with Blackpool at Bloomfield Road. Cowie scored two more goals in two goal fests which included a 4–3 loss at Peterborough United and a 5–3 victory against Barnsley at Cardiff City Stadium. He made his 400th career appearance in a 1–0 win over Crystal Palace in the League Cup, a tie which saw Cardiff reach their first-ever final in the competition. Cowie played the entirety of the Wembley final against Premier League Liverpool, but after a 2–2 draw following extra time, the Reds won the final 3–2 on penalties, a shootout in which Cowie took and converted Cardiff's second penalty.

Cowie opened his goal account for the 2012–13 season on 22 September against Crystal Palace. Cowie scored two goals and made twenty-five appearances in a season in which Cardiff won the Championship title, securing promotion to the Premier League. The club was relegated from the Premier League after its first season in the top flight. Cowie was offered a new contract by manager Ole Gunnar Solskjaer, but he decided to leave the club.

Wigan 
Cowie signed for Wigan Athletic on a two-year contract in July 2014.

Hearts 
Cowie became the first signing of Scottish Premiership side Hearts during the 2015–16 winter transfer window, signing a two-a-half-year deal with the Tynecastle club. In August 2017, his contract was extended by one year.

Ross County (second spell) 
Cowie rejoined Ross County in August 2018. He retired from playing in June 2020, and moved into a coaching role with Ross County. He is currently assistant manager to Malky Mackay, who signed Cowie as a player at Watford and Cardiff City respectively.

International career 
On 7 October 2009, Cowie was called up to the Scotland squad for the first time. He made his debut in the match, a 2–0 defeat against Japan, on 10 October. Cowie started in his second game for Scotland in a friendly against Wales at the new home of Cardiff City. His first competitive start for Scotland came against Lithuania on 6 September 2011 in the UEFA Euro 2012 qualifier.

Personal life 
Cowie is a member of a footballing family: his wife, Shelley, previously played football for Glasgow City F.C. and the Scottish national team, but gave up in order to start a family. Her twin sister, Suzanne Grant, played for Celtic Ladies until 2015 and the Scottish national team until 2014. Suzanne is married to former Dundee United and Hamilton Academical player David Winters. His parents are originally from Helmsdale, in Sutherland.

Career statistics

Honours

Club 
Ross County
Scottish Championship: 2018–19
Scottish Challenge Cup: 2006–07, 2018–19

Cardiff City
Football League Championship: 2012–13

References

External links 

 

1983 births
Living people
Footballers from Inverness
Scottish footballers
Scotland international footballers
Association football midfielders
Ross County F.C. players
Inverness Caledonian Thistle F.C. players
Watford F.C. players
Cardiff City F.C. players
Wigan Athletic F.C. players
Heart of Midlothian F.C. players
Scottish Premier League players
Scottish Football League players
English Football League players
Premier League players
Scottish Professional Football League players
People educated at Dingwall Academy